Vicente Wanchope Kelly (born 19 July 1946) is a Costa Rican former footballer, who played most of his career at striker with Herediano.

Club career
Wanchope started his career at Limonense, for whom he scored a club record 54 goals, before moving to Herediano in 1969, a transfer which caused controversy because of an exorbitant high fee involved. He finished his career at Barrio México. Wanchope totalled 133 goals in the Costa Rica Primera División.

International career
Nicknamed La Gacela Negra (the Black Gazelle), he made his debut for Costa Rica in 1969 and earned 15 caps, scoring 3 goals. He represented Costa Rica at the 1975 Pan American Games in Mexico.

Personal life
Born in Jamaica, Wanchope is of Jamaican descent. He is married to Patricia Watson and was the first famous Wanchope football player to emerge in Costa Rica, followed by his three sons Javier, Paulo, and Carlos. After retiring, he worked for ICE in Colima de Tibás. His younger brother is Carlos Watson, former footballer and manager.

References

1946 births
Living people
People from Limón Province
Association football forwards
Costa Rican footballers
Costa Rica international footballers
Costa Rican people of Jamaican descent
C.S. Herediano footballers
Footballers at the 1975 Pan American Games
Pan American Games competitors for Costa Rica